Igor Igoshin (born 11 December 1970, Kirov, Kirov Oblast) is a Russian political figure and a deputy of 3rd, 4th, 5th, 6th, 7th, and 8th State Dumas. In 2004, he was awarded a Doctor of Sciences in Economics and Political Sciences. His dissertation was notable for plagiarism.

From 1995 to 1998, he worked as the CEO of the JSC "Agroproduct". In 1999 he was elected deputy of the 3rd State Duma. In 2003, 2007, 2011, 2016, and 2021 he was re-elected for the 4th, 5th, 6th, 7th, and 8th State Dumas respectively. He represents the Vladimir constituency.

References

1970 births
Living people
United Russia politicians
21st-century Russian politicians
Eighth convocation members of the State Duma (Russian Federation)
Seventh convocation members of the State Duma (Russian Federation)
Sixth convocation members of the State Duma (Russian Federation)
Fifth convocation members of the State Duma (Russian Federation)
Fourth convocation members of the State Duma (Russian Federation)
Third convocation members of the State Duma (Russian Federation)